Orquevaux is a commune in the Haute-Marne department in the Grand Est region in Northeastern France. In 2017, it had a population of 80.

Geography
The village of Orquevaux is considered one of the most beautiful villages in the Champagne-Ardenne area with its Napoleon III style Château d'Orquevaux sitting on the hilltop. Since 2017 artists from all over the world have attended the Château d'Orquevaux International Artist Residency.

See also
Communes of the Haute-Marne department

References

Communes of Haute-Marne